Durlav Kumar Thapa is a retired police chief of Nepal Police. He is a highly decorated police officer whose contributions to the then National Police Training Academy. In 2013 he was awarded the Nepal Police’s Lifetime Achievement award at the Sadar Prahari Talim Kendra. During his tenure as I.G.P., he had introduced "Tourist police" and the IGP Residence.
He now lives a retired life in Patan.

References

Living people
Year of birth missing (living people)
Nepalese police officers
Chiefs of police
Inspectors General of Police (Nepal)
1960s in Nepal
1970s in Nepal
1980s in Nepal